Lasse Heinze (born 3 April 1986) is a Danish professional retired football player, who played as a goalkeeper. He is currently working for FC Midtjylland Academy as goalkeeper coach.

Career
He has played four games for the Danish under-21 national team.

Heinze was included in the FC Midtjylland (FCM) first team squad in 2002, and got his senior debut in the Spring 2005. In the spring 2007, Heinze contended with newly bought Czech goalkeeper Martin Raška for the position of starting goalkeeper. Heinze was initially selected to tend the goal, but following fluctuating performances, FCM manager Erik Rasmussen replaced him with Raška.

Retirement
After several hip-injuries, the keeper decided to retire on 22 November 2015.

After retiring
Only three days after Heinze announced his retirement, he was hired as goalkeeper coach for the FC Midtjylland Academy.

References

External links
 Lasse Heinze on Soccerway
 Danish national team profile
 Official danish league stats

1986 births
Living people
Danish men's footballers
Denmark under-21 international footballers
FC Midtjylland players
Ikast FS players
Silkeborg IF players
Danish Superliga players
Danish expatriate men's footballers
Danish expatriate sportspeople in Norway
Expatriate footballers in Norway
Sarpsborg 08 FF players
Eliteserien players
Association football goalkeepers